The Ford Probe GTP, also sometimes called the Ford Mustang Probe GTP, was an IMSA GTP sports racing car, designed, developed and built by German constructor Zakspeed, and used by the Zakspeed Racing team in the 1985 IMSA GT Championship. It was based on the standard road-going Ford Probe, and was the successor to the Ford Mustang GTP race car.. Unlike the road car, using a conventional front-engined designed, the prototype race car used a mid-engined design (also known as a rear mid-engine design; behind the driver, but in front of the rear axle). It was powered by the same  turbocharged Cosworth BDA straight-four engine, producing , which was plenty powerful enough for the lightweight  vehicle. This drove the rear wheels through a five-speed Hewland VG5 manual transmission. Klaus Ludwig, Doc Bundy, Lyn St. James, Scott Pruett, Pete Halsmer, Arie Luyendyk, Tom Gloy, and Chip Robinson all drove the car. Highlights for the car included two second-place podium finishes at Watkins Glen and Sears Point in 1985, and an outright win for Klaus Ludwig at Laguna Seca in 1986.

References

IMSA GTP cars
Ford racing cars
Ford Mustang
Rear-wheel-drive vehicles
Zakspeed racing cars